Feel the Heat can refer to any of the following:
"Feel the Heat" (song), by Beautiful People
Feel the Heat (book), 2009 Romantic Intrigue Award winner
Feel the Heat (album), by the Radiators